Puligoru Venkata Sanjay Kumar (born on 14 August 1963) is a Judge of the Supreme Court of India. He is former Chief Justice of Manipur High Court. He has also served as Judge of Punjab and Haryana High Court and Telangana High Court.

Early life
P.V. Kumar was born on 14 August 1963, in Hyderabad to late P. Ramachandra Reddy and P. Padmavathamma. P.Ramachandra Reddy was the former Advocate General of Andhra Pradesh High Court (1969 to 1982). He completed his graduation in Commerce from Nizam College, Hyderabad, and Law Degree from Delhi University in 1988 and enrolled in the Bar Council of Andhra Pradesh in August 1988.

Career 
He practiced at Andhra Pradesh High Court. He has served as the government pleader in the Andhra Pradesh High Court from 2000 to 2003. He was elevated as additional judge of Telangana High Court on 8 August 2008 and made permanent judge on 20 January 2010. He was transferred as Judge of Punjab and Haryana High Court on 14 October 2019.

He was elevated as Chief Justice of Manipur High Court on 12 February 2021 and took the oath on 14 February 2021.

References 

Indian judges
Delhi University alumni
Chief Justices of Manipur High Court
Judges of the Andhra Pradesh High Court
Judges of the Punjab and Haryana High Court
1963 births
Living people